Arach may be:
 an abbreviation for the Arachnis genus of plants
 a phonetic spelling of either:
 Araç, a town in Turkey
 Arač, former name of Novi Bečej, a town in Serbia

See also 
 Arrach, a municipality of Germany